Svensk handbollselit is the highest division of women's handball in Sweden.  The inaugural Elitserien season took place in 1951, with Kvinnliga IK Sport winning the championship.

The league currently consists of 12 teams. The eight top teams at the end of every season continue to the playoffs, in which the quarterfinals and semifinals are played as a best-of-five series, unlike the final which is played as a single match. The champion is awarded a spot in the EHF Women's Champions League's qualification stage.  

Historically, the women's Elitserien was dominated by IK Sävehof, with 15 championships.  

For the 2016-2017 season, the series changed name to "Svensk handbollselit". Until then, it was called Elitserien

Current season

Teams for season 2020–21

BK Heid
Boden Handboll IF
H 65 Höörs HK
IK Sävehof
Kristianstad HK
Kungälvs HK
Lugi HF
Önnereds HK
Skara HF
Skövde HF
Skuru IK
VästeråsIrsta HF

List of Swedish Champions in women's handball

 1951 Kvinnliga IK Sport
 1952 Kvinnliga IK Sport
 1953 Kvinnliga IK Sport
 1954 Kvinnliga IK Sport
 1955 Kvinnliga IK Sport
 1956 IF Guif
 1957 Kvinnliga IK Sport
 1958 Kvinnliga IK Sport
 1959 Kvinnliga IK Sport
 1960 Kvinnliga IK Sport
 1961 Kvinnliga IK Sport
 1962 IK Ymer
 1963 IK Bolton
 1964 Kvinnliga IK Sport
 1965 IK Bolton
 1966 IK Bolton
 1967 IK Bolton
 1968 IK Bolton
 1969 Kvinnliga IK Sport
 1970 Borlänge HK
 1971 Kvinnliga IK Sport
 1972 Kvinnliga IK Sport
 1973 Borlänge HK

 1974 Stockholmspolisens IF
 1975 Stockholmspolisens IF
 1976 Stockholmspolisens IF
 1977 Stockholmspolisens IF
 1978 Borlänge HK
 1979 Stockholmspolisens IF
 1980 Stockholmspolisens IF
 1981 Stockholmspolisens IF
 1982 Stockholmspolisens IF
 1983 Stockholmspolisens IF
 1984 Stockholmspolisens IF
 1985 Stockholmspolisens IF
 1986 Irsta HF
 1987 Tyresö HF
 1988 Tyresö HF
 1989 Tyresö HF
 1990 Stockholmspolisens IF
 1991 Irsta HF
 1992 Skånela IF
 1993 IK Sävehof
 1994 Sävsjö HK
 1995 Sävsjö HK
 1996 Sävsjö HK

 1997 HP Warta
 1998 Sävsjö HK
 1999 Sävsjö HK
 2000 IK Sävehof
 2001 Skuru IK
 2002 Eslövs IK
 2003 Eslövs IK
 2004 Skuru IK
 2005 Skuru IK
 2006 IK Sävehof
 2007 IK Sävehof
 2008 Skövde HF
 2009 IK Sävehof
 2010 IK Sävehof
 2011 IK Sävehof
 2012 IK Sävehof
 2013 IK Sävehof
 2014 IK Sävehof
 2015 IK Sävehof
 2016 IK Sävehof
 2017 H 65 Höör
 2018 IK Sävehof
 2019 IK Sävehof

 2020 No champion due to COVID-19.
 2021 Skuru IK
 2022 IK Sävehof

EHF league ranking
EHF League Ranking for 2022/23 season:

9.  (8)  Handball-Bundesliga Frauen (56.33) 
10.  (11)  1. A DRL11.  (10)   SHE Women (37.40)'12.  (13)  PGNiG Superliga (33.00)
13.  (12'')  Extraliga (31.50)

References

Women's handball leagues
Handball competitions in Sweden
Women's handball in Sweden
Women's sports leagues in Sweden
Professional sports leagues in Sweden